Robert "Bob" Miller Montague, Jr. (1924-1996) was an American brigadier general. He was also the Special Assistant to the Assistant Secretary of Defense for All-Volunteer Force Action. Montague was one of the earliest strategists of the Vietnam War.

Biography 
Gen. Montague was born in Hawaii on October 22, 1924. He was the son of Robert Miller Montague, a Commander of the U.S. Caribbean Command. His formative years were spent in a number of peacetime Army posts. These included the time he stayed at Forth Leavenworth, where he completed his primary education and junior high school. He then completed his high school at Woodrow Wilson High School in 1942. Before he was accepted to the United States Military Academy at West Point, New York, he was already in his sophomore year at Purdue University. He was admitted to the Academy as a Qualified Alternate from Louisville, Kentucky. He graduated top of the Class of 1947. 

In the 1950s, Montague worked for the Defense Department and Atomic Energy Commission during these agencies' development of nuclear warheads. He continued working for the Department of Defense during the tenure of Secretary Robert McNamara. He established the first systems-analysis office at the Department of Army headquarters.

When he was a colonel, Montague became part of Ambassador Robert W. Komer's personal staff during the latter's administration of the Civil Operations and Revolutionary Development Support (CORDS) program in Vietnam. He became an aide to Komer both in the White House and Saigon. In November 1970, he joined the Special Assistant for the Modern Volunteer Army (SAMVA), where he was noted for his innovations in all-volunteer concept work. Prior to 1970, he was the commander of the 5th Infantry Division Artillery at Fort Carson, Colorado. He retired from service in 1974.

Retirement 
After retirement, Montague founded R.M. Montague and Associates. He also became the executive director of Special Olympics International, which oversaw a $150 million sports program for mentally retarded persons. He had also worked as head of the Joseph P. Kennedy Jr. Foundation.

Personal life 
Montague was married to Christa Montague. The couple had three children, David, John, and Jeanie. He died of cancer on October 11, 1996, at Walter Reed Army Medical Center.

References 

United States Army Field Artillery Branch personnel
United States Military Academy alumni
United States Army generals
Military personnel from Hawaii
1924 births

1996 deaths

Burials at Arlington National Cemetery